The WWF Women's Tag Team Championship was a women's professional wrestling tag team title in the World Wrestling Federation (WWF, now WWE). The belief its holders were considered world champions was expressed by Jesse Ventura, an announcer for some of its defenses. Velvet McIntyre and Princess Victoria were recognized as the inaugural champions when they came to the promotion in 1983 as the National Wrestling Alliance's World Women's Tag Team Champions. The final champions were The Glamour Girls (Leilani Kai and Judy Martin) when the titles were abandoned in 1989.

History
In 1983, the team of Velvet McIntyre and Princess Victoria joined the World Wrestling Federation (WWF, now WWE) as the reigning NWA World Women's Tag Team Champions. However, the WWF had since withdrawn from the National Wrestling Alliance (NWA), and the rights to the championship were owned by The Fabulous Moolah. The WWF in turn bought the rights to the championship from Moolah, and recognized McIntyre and Victoria as the first WWF Women's Tag Team Champions. This ended the lineage of the World Women's Tag Team Championship, though the WWF continued to use the championship belts of the former title to represent their new title. After six years, the championship was abandoned in 1989, with The Glamour Girls (Leilani Kai and Judy Martin) as the final champions. This happened largely due to the lack of tag teams in the women's division, and a lack of female performers in general.

During the December 24, 2018, episode of Monday Night Raw, WWE Chairman and Chief Executive Officer Vince McMahon announced that a new WWE Women's Tag Team Championship would be introduced in 2019. However, it does not carry the lineage of the original title.

Reigns
Over the course of the championship's six-year history, there were five reigns between four championship teams, composed of seven individual champions. The inaugural championship team was Velvet McIntyre and Princess Victoria. The Glamour Girls (Leilani Kai and Judy Martin) had the most reigns as a team at two, while individually, Kai, Martin, and McIntyre had the most reigns, also at two. The Glamour Girls' first reign was the longest reign at 909 days, and they had the longest combined reign at 1,157 days. The Jumping Bomb Angels (Noriyo Tateno and Itsuki Yamazaki) had the shortest reign at 136 days. McIntyre was the youngest champion when she was recognized as one-half of the inaugural championship team at 20 years old, while the oldest was Martin when she won the championship at 32 for her second reign.

Combined reigns

By team

By wrestler

See also
 List of former championships in WWE
 Tag team championships in WWE
 Women's championships in WWE

References

External links
 WWF Women's Tag Team Title History

WWE women's championships
WWE tag team championships
Women's professional wrestling tag team championships
WWE championships